William Young (8 March 1861 – 6 October 1933) was an English cricketer. White's batting style is unknown, though it is known he played as a wicket-keeper. He was born at Staveley, Derbyshire.

Young made a single first-class appearance for Liverpool and District against Yorkshire in 1891 at Aigburth Cricket Ground, Liverpool. In a match which Liverpool and District won by 54 runs, Young batted twice, ending Liverpool and District's first-innings not out on 21, while in their second-innings he was dismissed for a duck by Bobby Peel.

He died at the town of his birth on 6 October 1933.

References

External links
William Young at ESPNcricinfo
William Young at CricketArchive

1861 births
1933 deaths
People from Staveley, Derbyshire
Cricketers from Derbyshire
English cricketers
Liverpool and District cricketers
Wicket-keepers